"I'll Give You All My Love Tonight" is a song written by David Bellamy, Billy Crain and Wally Dentz, and recorded by American country music duo The Bellamy Brothers.  It was released in May 1988 as the third single from the album Crazy from the Heart.  The song reached number 6 on the Billboard Hot Country Singles & Tracks chart.

Charts

Weekly charts

Year-end charts

References

1988 singles
1987 songs
The Bellamy Brothers songs
Songs written by Billy Crain
Song recordings produced by Emory Gordy Jr.
MCA Records singles
Curb Records singles
Songs written by David Bellamy (singer)